The Department of Science and Technology (DST) is a department within the Ministry of Science and Technology in India. It was established in May 1971 to promote new areas of science and technology and to play the role of a nodal department for organising, coordinating and promoting Scientific and Technological activities in the country. It gives funds to various approved scientific projects in India. It also supports various researchers in India to attend conferences abroad and to go for experimental works.

Jitendra Singh is Minister of State (Independent Charge), while S. Chandrasekhar is its secretary.

Open access 
Department of Science and Technology (India) supports open access to scientific knowledge, originated from the public-funded research in India. In December 2014, the DST and the Department of Biotechnology (DBT), Government of India had jointly adopted their Open Access Policy.

Scientific Programmes

Autonomous S&T Institutions 
The autonomous science and technology institutions organized under the department include:
Agharkar Research Institute, Pune
Aryabhatta Research Institute of Observational Sciences, Nanital 
Birbal Sahni Institute of Palaeosciences, Lucknow
Bose Institute, Kolkata
Centre for Nano and Soft Matter Sciences, Bangalore
Indian Institute of Geomagnetism, Mumbai
International Advanced Research Centre for Powder Metallurgy and New Materials, Hyderabad
Institute of Nano Science and Technology, SAS Nagar
Indian Association for the Cultivation of Science, Kolkata
Indian Institute of Astrophysics, Bengaluru 
National Innovation Foundation
Jawaharlal Nehru Centre for Advanced Scientific Research, Bengaluru
Raman Research Institute, Bengaluru
Sree Chitra Tirunal Institute for Medical Sciences and Technology
S.N. Bose National Centre for Basic Sciences, Kolkata
The Institute of Advanced Study in Science & Technology, Guwahati
Technology Information, Forecasting and Assessment Council (TIFAC)
North East Centre for Technology Application and Reach (NECTAR)
Wadia Institute of Himalayan Geology, Dehradun
Vigyan Prasar, New Delhi

Attached Institutions
National Atlas & Thematic Mapping Organisation, Kolkata
Survey of India, Dehradun

References

External links

Ministry of Science and Technology (India)
Science and technology in India
Science and technology ministries
1971 establishments in India